Ritthidet Phensawat (born March 21, 1997) is a Thai professional footballer who plays as a left-winger for Thai League 2 side Phrae United.

Honours

International
Thailand U-23
 2019 AFF U-22 Youth Championship: Runner up
Thailand U-19
 2015 AFF U-19 Youth Championship: Champion

References

External links
 

1997 births
Living people
Ritthidet Phensawat
Association football wingers
Ritthidet Phensawat
Ritthidet Phensawat
Ritthidet Phensawat
Ritthidet Phensawat
Ritthidet Phensawat